Kerry Good (born 10 November 1958) is a former Australian rules footballer who played with North Melbourne in the VFL during the late 1970s and early 1980s.

Good was a forward and kicked 49 goals in the 1981 VFL season, including a career best ten goals against Melbourne in round 20. He is best remembered for kicking a controversial, after the siren, goal to win North Melbourne the 1980 Escort Championships Grand Final (also known as the Night Series). North Melbourne was playing Collingwood at VFL Park in the decider and Good marked a kick from Malcolm Blight at centre half-forward but the siren had sounded before the ball had reached him – but the umpire had not heard the siren, so Good was allowed to take his kick and goaled to give his side a three-point win.

References

Details of the after the siren kick

1958 births
Living people
North Melbourne Football Club players
Ulverstone Football Club players
Tasmanian State of Origin players
Australian rules footballers from Tasmania
Tasmanian Football Hall of Fame inductees